Dylan Mackin (born 15 January 1997) is a Scottish footballer who plays as a striker for West of Scotland Football League side Kilwinning Rangers.

He has previously played for Falkirk, Motherwell, Livingston, and on loan for Airdrieonians, Alloa Athletic, Stirling Albion and Brechin City.

Career
Mackin is a product of the Motherwell Academy. On 13 December 2015, he made his debut for Motherwell as a substitute in the closing stages of a 3–1 home win against Dundee. In January 2016, Mackin and fellow Well player David Ferguson moved on loan to Airdrieonians until the end of the season. On 27 January 2017, Mackin moved on a development loan to Alloa Athletic. He was released by Motherwell in May 2017, at the end of his contract.

On 20 June 2017, Mackin signed for Livingston, agreeing a two-year contract. He then moved on loan to Brechin City on 30 January 2018.

Mackin signed for Falkirk on a one-year deal on 10 July 2018.

Mackin was released from Falkirk on 5 October 2018 after only making a handful of appearances and little goals; he was released as Ray Mackinnon begins his clear out of the squad.

The next stage of his career took him to Forthbank Stadium, to sign with Stirling Albion.

Upon his release from Stirling Albion in 2022, he signed a two-year deal with West of Scotland Football League side Kilwinning Rangers.

Career statistics

Honours
Kilwinning Rangers
 Eglinton Cup: 2022

References

External links
 
 

1997 births
Living people
Footballers from Irvine, North Ayrshire
Scottish footballers
Association football forwards
Motherwell F.C. players
Airdrieonians F.C. players
Alloa Athletic F.C. players
Livingston F.C. players
Brechin City F.C. players
Scottish Professional Football League players
Falkirk F.C. players
Stirling Albion F.C. players
Kilwinning Rangers F.C. players
West of Scotland Football League players